Ariel Teal Toombs (born June 7, 1985) is an American actress and professional wrestler, also known by the ring name Teal Piper. She is the daughter of the professional wrestler and actor Roddy Piper.

Acting career 
After graduating from high school in Oregon, Toombs relocated to Los Angeles, California to work in the entertainment industry. She made her acting debut in the 2006 film Shut Up and Shoot!. She appeared alongside her father in the films Lights Out and  The Portal. Her roles have included an episode of CSI: NY.

Professional wrestling career 
In 2016-2017, Toombs was named as a potential roster member for a new women's wrestling promotion featuring the daughters of professional wrestlers planned to be launched by Brooke Hogan.

Toombs trained as a wrestler under Selina Majors and Tessa Blanchard in the Women of Wrestling promotion in Long Beach, California. She made her professional wrestling debut on August 31, 2019, with All Elite Wrestling, competing in a Casino Battle Royale at the All Out pay-per-view under the ring name "Teal Piper". That same month, it was reported that she had signed to appear on season two of the Women of Wrestling program WOW Superheroes, which aired on AXS TV in late-2019. On WOW Superheroes, Piper hosted a talk show segment titled "Teal Talks".

In 2020, Piper trained with Ronda Rousey ahead of Rousey's return to professional wrestling. In 2021 and 2022, she wrestled for various independent promotions in Alabama, Florida, and Mississippi, occasionally teaming with her fiancé Deimos as "House of Heathens". In September 2022, she appeared in Athens, Greece for ZMAK Wrestling. In January 2023, Piper returned to AEW, teaming with Kel in a loss to Anna Jay A.S. and Tay Melo on an episode of AEW Dark.

Filmography

Professional wrestling style and persona 
Piper's signature moves are a sleeper hold and an eye poke. While appearing with Women of Wrestling, her character was described as having a "penchant for shenanigans" and as having "a habit of being at the center of misunderstandings, and somehow always followed by mischief".

Personal life 
Toombs is the daughter of professional wrestler and actor Roddy Toombs  (1954 – 2015), better known as "Roddy Piper". Following her father's death, she and her brother Colt Baird Toombs worked together to complete and posthumously publish her father's autobiography, Rowdy: The Roddy Piper Story. She became engaged to her partner Michael Anderson (who wrestles as "Deimos") in December 2020.

References

External links 
 
 
 

1985 births
21st-century professional wrestlers
American female professional wrestlers
American film actresses
American people of Canadian descent
American television actresses
Living people
People from Hillsboro, Oregon
Professional wrestlers from Oregon